Earthquake Network research project that aims to develop and maintain a crowdsourced smartphone-based earthquake warning system at a global level. The system uses the on-board accelerometers in privately-owned smartphones of volunteer participants to detect earthquake waves (rather than conventional seismometers). When it detects an earthquake, it issues an earthquake warning to alert people who the damaging waves of the earthquake have not yet reached.

The project started on January 1, 2013 with the release of the homonymous Android application Earthquake Network. The author of the research project and developer of the smartphone application is Francesco Finazzi of the University of Bergamo, Italy.

Scientific research
Earthquake warning systems strive to rapidly detect earthquakes and alert the population in advance. When the system detects an earthquake, a potentially large number of people in affected locations not too close to the epicenter can receive the warning several seconds (5 to 60) before damaging shaking occurs. This is possible because data flows through the phone system faster than earthquake waves travel.

Working principle
Smartphones with the Earthquake Network application installed are nodes of the sensor network of the Earthquake Network project. When a smartphone is not in use and is connected to a power source, the application switches on the accelerometer to monitor the smartphone acceleration. If motion exceeds a threshold, the smartphone sends a signal to a central server. The server collects the signals sent by all the smartphones and applies a statistical algorithm to decide in real time whether an earthquake is likely occurring. If the system detects an earthquake, it instantly notifies all the smartphones through the application. The application sounds an alarm, and the smartphone owner can warn others and take cover.

Network size and geographic distribution
The number of smartphones in the network is highly variable as users can install or uninstall the Earthquake Network application at any time. Additionally, the number of active smartphones (not in use and connected to a source of power) constantly changes during the day. Globally, the total number of smartphones with the application installed is around 750,000 (September 2017) and the number of active smartphones ranges from around 30,000 to around 120,000 depending on the hour of the day. The geographic distribution of the network nodes is given in the following table.

Detected earthquakes
From the beginning of the project, the smartphone network detected 4,900+ earthquakes as of February 2023. Most of the earthquakes were detected in Chile where the network is quite stable in terms of number of smartphones. As an example, the magnitude 8.3 Illapel earthquake was detected by the smartphones in the city of Valparaíso. Smartphones in Santiago received the warning 10 seconds before the earthquake, while smartphones in Mendoza received the warning 20 seconds in advance.

Project development
The Earthquake Network project is expected to solve 4 main problems related to earthquake detection and location using a smartphone network.

Real-time detection
To be effective, the earthquake warning system of the Earthquake Network project must detect the earthquake as fast as possible. It detects earthquakes through real-time analysis of the data that the smartphone network sends to the central server. Since smartphones detect accelerations not necessarily induced by an earthquake, the server implements a statistical algorithm that recognizes real earthquakes against background noise. The statistical methods at the basis of the algorithm provides control over the probability of false alarm. Development stage: released.

Epicenter estimation
When detection occurs, it is important to obtain an estimate of the epicenter in order to locate the geographic areas that was affected by the earthquake. Two epicenter estimation algorithms for crowdsourced smartphone-based earthquake early warning systems have been developed and they are detailed in a paper published on the Bulletin of the Seismological Society of America journal. Development stage: released.

Peak ground acceleration
The accelerations recorded by a dense smartphone network can be used to produce high resolution peak ground acceleration maps for the detected earthquakes. The task is complicated by the fact that smartphones are not secured to the ground, so they don't directly measure ground acceleration. If properly calibrated, however, data from a large number of smartphones may be sufficient to estimate ground acceleration. Development stage: analysis.

Magnitude estimation
The earthquake magnitude is an important parameter, as it defines the energy released by the earthquake event and helps evaluate earthquake severity in terms of potential damages to property and people. Magnitude estimation using the data collected by the smartphone network is currently under study. Development stage: analysis.

References

External links
Earthquake Network - The Earthquake Network project website
Earthquake Network Android application - The Android application of the Earthquake Network project

Earthquake and seismic risk mitigation
Crowdsourcing